Piarco is a town in northern Trinidad and is the site of Piarco International Airport .

Geography
Piarco is the site of one of the few natural savannas in Trinidad and Tobago, the Piarco Savanna. Most of this savanna land has been incorporated into the airport.

Piarco is bounded by Orange Grove to the west, Trincity/Maloney to the north and Mausica to the east. Piarco comprises a few areas/villages such as Oropune, Golden Grove and St Helena.

Administration
Piarco, which is located south of Trincity and Tunapuna, is administered by the Tunapuna–Piarco Regional Corporation.

Economy
Caribbean Airlines has its headquarters in the Iere House, Golden Grove Road Piarco. Prior to the establishment of Caribbean Airlines, BWIA West Indies Airways was headquartered on the airport property in Piarco.

The Airports Authority of Trinidad and Tobago has its headquarters in the Airports Administration Centre, in the South Terminal of the airport.

References

Populated places in Trinidad and Tobago